Scudo may refer to:

Currency
 Bolivian scudo
 Italian scudo
 Lombardy-Venetia scudo
 Maltese scudo
 Milanese scudo
 Papal States scudo
 Piedmont scudo
 Sardinian scudo

Other
 Fiat Scudo, a medium-sized van